Andrew Jackson "Jack" Rhodes (January 12, 1907 –  October 9, 1968) was an American country music producer and songwriter, with songwriting credits on over 625 released songs. Several of his songs became hit records, including "A Satisfied Mind", "Silver Threads and Golden Needles", "Conscience I'm Guilty", "The Waltz of the Angels", "Beautiful Lies", and "Till the Last Leaf Shall Fall". Inducted into the Nashville Songwriters Hall of Fame posthumously in 1972, he was more recently celebrated as one of the founding fathers of rockabilly, having written for Gene Vincent and Capitol Records. He was inducted into the Rockabilly Hall of Fame in 2009. Jack Rhodes memorabilia is on exhibit at the Mineola Historical Museum in Mineola, Texas and the Nashville Songwriters Hall of Fame in Nashville.

Rhodes is recognized for the groundbreaking rockabilly songs "Rockin' Bones", "Action Packed", and "Woman Love". Revered as an influential mentor for many an upstart artist in the mid to late 1950s, he and his collaborators wrote many songs for Gene Vincent while on the Capitol label.

BMI awarded him for over a million radio broadcasts of "Silver Threads and Golden Needles", and he received numerous gold records for various releases. One of these was a US country music #1 hit with "A Satisfied Mind" by Porter Wagoner.

Biography
Jack Rhodes was born on January 12, 1907 in Martin's Mill, Texas, an unincorporated community located in Van Zandt County. Little is known about his early childhood except that he never completed school. The 1940 U.S. Census indicates that Rhodes' highest level of education was through the 6th grade in primary school. Like many school-age children during that period, he quit to help support his family. He had five siblings and one step brother.

During World War II, he worked in the Houston, Texas shipyards.  Rhodes started his career as a songwriter after breaking his back in a work-related accident. While recovering, he began writing songs, trying to stave off the boredom of being bedridden.

Rhodes owned a café in Grand Saline, Texas, and later opened The Trail 80 Motor Courts, a gas station and restaurant in Mineola, Texas.

Leon Payne (Rhodes' step-brother) wrote "I Love You Because", which has been covered by — among others — Elvis Presley (Elvis Presley LP, 1956), Al Martino (Billboard Hot 100 #3, 1963), Jim Reeves (UK Singles Chart #5, 1964), Johnny Cash, Matt Monro and Slim Whitman.

Rhodes' married Gladyce Lucile Yates in 1929.  They had three sons,  Bobby, Billy Jack, and Don, and a daughter, Wanda.

Rhodes divorced Lucile sometime prior to his marriage to second wife, Loretta Joyce Williams in 1955. Rhodes and Loretta had one son, Buddy, in 1956.

In October 1968 Rhodes died of a heart attack while at home, having just returned from Nashville with his intent on retirement.

Career
Throughout his early years, Jack Rhodes formed several hillbilly/western swing groups with his step-brother Leon Payne, The Lone Star Buddies being among the most famous. The group released several singles and were regulars at The Louisiana Hayride, as well as performing throughout East Texas and Louisiana. Rhodes would often record demos at KWKH in Shreveport and other surrounding radio stations, before creating his own studio in Mineola, Tx.

He also formed The Jack Rhodes Ramblers, Jack Rhodes and The Trail 80 Boys, and Jack Rhodes and The Trail 80 Roundup.

Rhodes founded his own record label, "National Sounds", under his company, All-Roads Music Publishing. Rhodes also owned Red Ball Music Publishing.

Pressings from his "National Sounds" label are rare and sought after by collectors. Most releases were Rockabilly songs, although some standard country songs were also made.

"The Lone Star Buddies"

"Lipstick Trail"

"Empty Arms"

"Mama Loves Papa, and Papa Loves the Women"

Covers and Movie Soundtracks

Porter Wagoner — "Coal Miner's Daughter" and "The People vs. Larry Flynt"

Glen Campbell

Jeff Buckley

Johnny Cash — "Kill Bill Vol. 2"

Red Foley

Joan Baez

Bob Dylan

The Byrds — "Woman Love" and "A Satisfied Mind "

Gene Vincent — "The Singing Detective"

Hazel Dickens — "By The Sweat Of My Brow"

References

External links
 Hollywood.com

American country songwriters
American male songwriters
1907 births
1958 deaths
People from Van Zandt County, Texas
20th-century American musicians
Songwriters from Texas
20th-century American male musicians